John Conroy (1786–1854) was a British army officer and comptroller to the Duchess of Kent and Princess Victoria, future Queen of the United Kingdom.

John Conroy may also refer to:
 Sir John Conroy, 3rd Baronet (1845–1900), English analytical chemist
 John Conroy (field hockey) (1928–1985), British field hockey player
 John Conroy (trade unionist) (1904–1969), Irish trade union leader
 John J. Conroy (1819–1895), Irish-born clergyman of the Roman Catholic Church
 John M. Conroy (1920–1979), American aircraft designer

See also
Jack Conroy, leftist American writer